Thinking Of You is an album by Kitarō which won at the 43rd Grammy Awards for Best New Age Album.

Track listing

Charts

Awards

External links
Kitaro Official site (English)
Kitaro Official site (Japanese)
Kitaro TV - Kitaro's official YouTube page
Kitaro Facebook

References 

Kitarō albums
1999 albums